The access stratum (AS) in computer networking and telecommunications is a functional layer in the UMTS and LTE wireless telecom protocol stacks between radio network and user equipment.  
While the definition of the access stratum is very different between UMTS and LTE, in both cases the access stratum is responsible for transporting data over the wireless connection and managing radio resources. The radio network is also called access network.

   +- - - - - -+       +- - - - - - -+
  | HTTP      |       | Application |
  +- - - - - -+       +- - - - - - -+
  | TCP       |       | Transport   |
  +- - - - - -+       +- - - - - - -+
  | IP        |       | Internet    |
  +- - - - - -+       +- - - - - - -+
  | NAS       |       | Network     |
  +- - - - - -+       +- - - - - - -+
  | AS        |       | Link        |
  +- - - - - -+       +- - - - - - -+
  | Channels  |       | Physical    |
   +- - - - - -+       +- - - - - - -+

See also

Mobility Management
GSM
Communication protocol
Internet protocol suite
X.25 protocol suite
OSI protocol suite

References

Mobile technology
Network protocols

ko:Non Access Stratum